Google Primer is a free mobile application by Google, designed to teach digital marketing and business skills to small and medium business owners, startups, and job seekers using 5-minute interactive lessons. It is a part of Google's Grow with Google and Digital Unlocked initiatives.

Primer officially debuted in the United States on September 15, 2015, and is now available in Latin America, Indonesia, India, Canada, and Australia. On May 17, 2018, Google Primer underwent a redesign to make it more accessible to all users and to provide new lesson content on accessibility.

According to the app’s website, Google partnered up with marketing and business professionals to create Primer's educational content.

See also
 List of Google tools and services
 Grow with Google
 Digital Unlocked

References

External links

Primer
Ministry of Communications and Information Technology (India)
Internet in India